Dirceu Ferreira (born 15 April 1942) is a Brazilian former footballer.

References

1942 births
Living people
Brazilian footballers
Association football forwards
Sociedade Esportiva Palmeiras players
Pan American Games medalists in football
Pan American Games gold medalists for Brazil
Footballers at the 1963 Pan American Games
Medalists at the 1963 Pan American Games